Jammu & Kashmir Bank Limited (J&K Bank) is a central public sector bank under the ownership of Ministry of Finance, Government of India. It is headquartered in Srinagar, Jammu and Kashmir. J&K Bank was incorporated on October 1, 1938, by then ruler of princely state of Jammu and Kashmir Maharaja Hari Singh with initial paid up capital of ₹ 5.00 Lakh. The bank has registered a total business turnover of over Rs.1750 billion as on March 31, 2021.

History
J&K Bank was founded on October 1, 1938, under letters patent issued by then Maharaja of Jammu & Kashmir, Maharaja Hari Singh. The Maharaja had invited eminent investors to become the founding directors and shareholders of the bank.

The bank commenced banking business on July 4, 1939, and was considered the first of its nature and composition as a state-owned bank in the country. The bank was established as a semi-state bank with participation in capital by state and the public under the control of state government.

Post-independence, the two branches of the Bank out of 10 branches viz. Muzaffarabad Rawalkot and Mirpur (now PAK) fell to the other side of the Line of Control along with cash and other assets.

The Bank is defined as a government company as per provisions of Indian Companies Act 2013. In 1971, the bank acquired the status of a Scheduled bank and was declared an ‘A’ class bank by Reserve Bank of India in 1976.

J&K Bank is the scheduled commercial and oldest private sector bank in India.

Milestones 
The bank celebrated its platinum jubilee in 2013. In that year the bank achieved a total business of  1000 billion and earned a net profit of 10 billion. On 1 April 2013 the bank surpassed the target of promised 1000 billion business and other annual targets as well in its platinum jubilee year.

The bank on October 1, 2018, completed its 80 years of existence and the day was celebrated by the Bank under the theme “80 years of bonding – I pledge to strengthen it”.

On July 1, 2019, the bank surpassed deposit base of Rs.1000 billion with over 10 million customers.

In July 2020, the bank figured among the top 4 banks in India in achieving targets in digital payments, contributing towards ‘Digital India’ mission.

Network
The Bank has over 2400 touch points across the country including 964 branches and 1388 ATMs as on Aug 31, 2021 spread over 18 states and 4 UTs. Out of 964 BUs, 804 are operating in the Union Territory of Jammu & Kashmir, 36 in Union Territory of Ladakh and 124 are operating outside the UTs of J&K and Ladakh. Bank has 75 Easy Banking Units (EBUs) in UT of J&K and Ladakh out of which 35 EBUs are operating in UT of Ladakh.

Subsidiaries 
J&K Bank provides investment & stock broking through its wholly owned subsidiary JKB Financial Services Limited (JKBFSL). It has 12 branches (5 Branches in Kashmir, 6 Branches in Jammu and 1 Branch in Gurgaon) besides having sales desks across 61 J & K Bank Branches across the Union Territory of J & K. JKBFSL provides services in stock broking, depository, distribution of mutual funds, IPOs, ETFs, Tax Planning etc.

Associate 
J&K Bank is also sponsor bank for J&K Grameen Bank with a share holding of 35% engaged in providing all kinds of financial services in UT of J&K and Ladakh. J&K Grameen Bank was established on June 30, 2009, and is functioning in 11 districts in the Union Territory of Jammu & Kashmir and 2 districts in UT of Ladakh.

Tie-ups 
Bank has entered into tie-ups with various national as well as multinational companies.

Under Bancassurance, Bank is a partner to PNB Metlife for life insurance while as for non-life, Bank has collaborated with Bajaj Allianz General Insurance Company Limited (BAGICL) & IFFCO Tokyo General Insurance Limited.

Besides, Bank has entered into business agreements with companies like TATA motors, Mahindra & Mahindra for extending its financial services to its consumers.

Corruption allegations 
J&K Bank has been allegedly accused on multiple occasions of un-accountability. In 2019, following the formation of the union territories of Jammu and Kashmir, the Anti-corruption Bureau started investigations into alleged corrupt practices by a number of bank officials, including former bank chairpersons Parvaiz Ahmad Nengroo and Mushtaq Ahmad Sheikh. From 2011, chairpersons of J&K Bank allegedly made over "2,500 backdoor appointments".

In August 2020, the Enforcement Directorate (ED) claimed that the son of former Jammu and Kashmir finance minister Abdul Rahim Rather, Hilal Rather, used money loaned from JK Bank "to splurge on foreign tours and acquire personal assets in India, Dubai and the US." In relation to this the ED raided a number of places in Srinagar, Jammu, Delhi and Punjab.

See also

 Banking in India
 List of banks in India
 Reserve Bank of India
 Indian Financial System Code
 List of largest banks
 List of companies of India
 Make in India

References

Economy of Jammu and Kashmir
Banks established in 1938
Private sector banks in India
Indian companies established in 1938
Companies listed on the National Stock Exchange of India
Companies listed on the Bombay Stock Exchange